Michael J. Horsey (born November 22, 1949) is a former Democratic member of the Pennsylvania House of Representatives.

He is a 1968 graduate of St. Thomas More High School in Philadelphia. He earned a degree from Cheyney State College in 1975, an Associate of Arts degree in Criminal Justice from Community College of Philadelphia in 1980, and a paralegal certification from Penn State University in 1983. He attended classes at Antioch Law School. Prior to elective office, Horsey worked as a manager at the Philadelphia Parking Authority, 6th Ward Democratic leader, and a Philadelphia Public School Teacher. He had two children with his wife Lorna Denise Horsey (Michael Horsey Jr., and Lauren Horsey), and currently has three grandchildren (John, Jordan, Micah and Jada Cherry).

He was first elected to represent the 190th legislative district in 1994. He was defeated in the 2004 Democratic primary by Thomas Blackwell.

References

External links
 official PA House profile (archived)
 official Party website (archived)

1949 births
Living people
Democratic Party members of the Pennsylvania House of Representatives
Cheyney University of Pennsylvania alumni
Community College of Philadelphia alumni
Pennsylvania State University alumni
Educators from Pennsylvania
David A. Clarke School of Law alumni